Secret Story - Casa dos Segredos 7 is the seventh season of the Portuguese reality television show Secret Story. It is based on the French version of Secret Story, which itself is based on the international format, Big Brother. The reality show is being broadcast on TVI. The castings were opened on December 4, 2017. The launch was on February 25, 2018. Lasting 92 days, the season ended on May 27, 2018, and Tiago was the winner.

Manuel Luís Goucha is the host of the main show.

Housemates

Bruno 
Bruno is 28 and lives in Amora, Seixal. He works as a Road Manager and loves the entertainment and night life. Behind his apparent calm and good vibe personality, there is a vigilant and manipulative person. He practices combat sports and loves to have his body defined. He cares a lot about his health and is really careful with his diet. His next goal is to win Secret Story. He was evicted on Day 43.
 Secret: I lived 7 months in a country of war.

Carina 
Carina is 27 and comes from Porto. She has a degree on Business Management and Marketing, and works as an insurance mediator. She considers herself an intelligent, observer and manipulative person. She doesn't like to be impulsive so she thinks a lot before she acts. She signed up to Secret Story so she could break the stereotype of reality shows contestants. For her, Secret Story is like a job and she is ready to play and win. She was evicted on Day 85.
 Secret: I'm the key of the tunnel of secrets.

Cátia 
Cátia is 29 and comes from Ponta Delgada, Azores Islands. She is ready to give us a lot of laughs thanks to her fast talking and accent. She has a twin sister, with whom she works along as assistants of a veterinary clinic. She doesn't have a boyfriend since it's difficult for her to find someone cool in the middle of nowhere, but she is ready perhaps to fall in love inside the house. She was evicted on Day 36.
 Secret: My father tried to kill me four times.

César 
César is 26, comes from Algarve and is a fadista singer. He has a degree on Entertainment Arts and has always been loyal to music. He considers himself a seductive, fearless and adventurous man. He assures that nothing will be boring while he's inside the house. He considers he's a man with a lot of love to give away, but his heart is with fellow housemate Gabriela for the past 5 years. He thinks the way to the victory is "climbing to the stardom". He was evicted on Day 71.
 Secret: I was naked for a magazine.

Gabriela 
Gabriela is 23 years old, comes from the Algarve and is a dancer and actress. He studied dance at the Olga Roriz Company and film and television, at the Nicholas Breyner Academy. He likes to skate and everything to do with dance. She defines herself as shy and passionate, a relentless and sentimental romantic. He says that Caesar is the love of his life, but he can not imagine what it will be like to live with him under the same roof. She was evicted on Day 85.
 Secret: I was terrified by an ex-boyfriend.

Isabela 
Isabela lives in Lisbon and is 19 years old. She finished 12th grade and is preparing to enter college. She is addicted to shopping, likes to put on makeup and loves being photographed. She says that behind her sweet and delicate appearance there is a fair woman who knows what she wants. It's not easy to get her out of earnest, but she assumes being terrified of being around people snoring. Despite being the youngest in the group, Isabela knows she has everything to overcome this great challenge. On Day 92 she finished in third place.
 Secret: I work in the circus.

Joana C. 
Joana is 21 years old and is from Coruche. He finished his 12th year in Management and is waiting to integrate into the job market. While this is not happening, she decided to join the House of Secrets and show that she is a fun, fearless Ribatejana capable of handling all the missions proposed by the Voice. It assumes being "nose in the air" and responds, does not like to give justifications to anyone. Come willing to do everything to reach the final of the House of Secrets. She was evicted on Day 57.
 Secret: I entered the House before all housemates.

Joana F. 
Joana is 25 years old and comes from the Button, a small village in the municipality of Mealhada. A beautician by profession, Joana loves what she does, despite her great passion being Samba, having already participated in some competitions of this dance mode. It is defined as well-disposed and charismatic, always with the answer at the tip of the tongue. Joana is sure, that her joy will infect everyone in the House. On Day 92 she became the runner up.
 Secret: I'm daughter of my stepmother's cousin.

João 
João is 25 years old and comes from Valongo. He is a sportsman by vocation, trains daily and enjoys making his own diet. João says he has no "middle ground" and is very insightful. Whoever provokes him, does not remain unanswered. It is single and of heart available. Enter the House of Secrets with your brother Pedro, to add spice to your life. He was evicted on Day 22.
 Secret: My brother saved my life.

Luan 
Luan is 26 years old and is from Santa Catarina, Brazil. He came to Portugal in Erasmus and fell in love with the country. He currently lives in Lisbon and works in a call center. He considers himself talented in the kitchen, thoughtful in his decisions, and likes to have everything done in his own way. It focuses on the energy and power of the mind, characteristics that it believes are key to winning it. On Day 92 he finished in fourth place.
 Secret: We are married.

Margarida 
Margarida is 35 years old, lives in Barreiro and is known to have been the founder and president of Clube das Virgens. She graduated in Social Communication, is a true "woman of the seven trades", developed Social Marketing campaigns, was part of the musical duo Barbie and Ken dedicated to children, was dancer of the first female cheerleader of Benfica and worked as security. In his personal blog, he shares the adventures and misadventures of his day-to-day life. Still in search of his enchanted prince, Margarida does not exclude the possibility of finding him inside the House. She was evicted on Day 8.
 Secret: I already wrote two books about my sex life.

Marlene 
Marlene is 32 years old, lives in Frankfurt, Germany and works in a bar in the city. He loves cooking and singing loud. She says she's temperamental, determined, and single for a few years because she can not find anyone who is up to her standards. It assumes itself as competitive and particularly ironic, with a personality that always generates controversy around him. Fearless, enter the House of Secrets to test your limits. She was evicted on Day 15.
 Secret: My sister was taken by a bishop of the IURD.

Nuno 
Nuno is 23 years old and comes from Oporto. He likes to take care of his image and goes to the gym every day. Defined as metrosexual and vain, you must always walk tanned and well dressed. Whoever knows him, says that he is frontal and arrogant, leaves nothing to be said. He says that in a capoeira, only one cock crows and he will sing in the House. He was evicted on Day 50.
 Secret: I saved thousands of people in Africa.

Pedro 
Pedro is 27 years old, lives in Valongo and has a master's degree in Medical Informatics. He is currently participating as an actor in a national fiction. He says that the power of argumentation is its highest quality. He is stubborn and provocative, he can persuade anyone who wants to do what is right for him. Confident and controversial, he is willing to play with the hearts of women and manipulate the minds of opponents. Embark on this adventure with João, his younger brother, to live together another limit experience. He was evicted on Day 64.
 Secret: I was blind for a month.

Rui 
Rui is 23 years old and lives in Vila Real de Santo António. He is a barber by profession and assumes to be obsessed with his image. He has done some plastic surgery to feel better and believes he has the most beautiful smile in Portugal. He is single and privileges colorful friendships. He says he is very picky with women and has not yet appeared a princess, who "fills" the measures. He was evicted on Day 78.
 Secret: I was kidnapped by a mistake in Spain.

Sofia 
Sofia is 27 years old and lives in Lisbon. Consider yourself a diva! Beautiful, elegant and very explosive. Likes to go out at night and dance. He appreciates dark, muscular boys, preferably at his feet. As he claims to be in bad shape, he dispatches them as soon as he is fed up with them, which happens all the time. She does not have a boyfriend and is prepared to speed up the hearts of the boys she meets in the House. She was evicted on Day 29.
 Secret: I tried to kill my father.

Tiago 
Tiago is 25 years old, lives in Lisbon and works in the area of Information Technology. He considers meticulous, thoughtful, and superstitious. It is focused on its goals and the proof of this is that, in about 5 months, it managed to lose more than 50 kg without diets. He says he will manipulate all opponents and become the winner of this edition. He finished as the winner on Day 92.
 Secret: We are married.

Secrets

Extra Secrets 
In the 'Tunnel of Secrets' of the house there are seven secrets related to the Seven Deadly Sins.

Nominations table

Notes

Nominations total received

Nominations: results 

 Votes to evict
 Votes to save
 Votes to win

Twists

Heaven and Hell 
Housemates were divided between 2 bedrooms throughout the game, in which they would win advantages or disadvantages in the game according to their position, mostly seen on the nominations process (where in general Hell housemates are immune and nominate Heaven housemates), but also in others such as the takeover of bags at the start of the season. Housemates switch bedrooms each week:

Note: In the last two weeks as there were few contestants they made all the contestants a "proof of endurance" soon they were all in the "Hell Room".

Ratings

Live eviction shows

References

External links 
 Official Website 
 Fan Website 

2018 Portuguese television seasons
07